Chionodes adam is a moth in the family Gelechiidae. It is found in North America, where it has been recorded from Colorado, Utah, Texas, New Mexico and Arizona.

The wingspan is about 21 mm.

References

Chionodes
Moths described in 1999
Moths of North America